Mianwal Araian is a village in Shahkot in Jalandhar district of Punjab State, India. The village is administrated by a sarpanch who is an elected representative of the village as per Panchayati raj (India).

Pre-Partition 
Before the partition in 1947, the village was in an area inhabited by Zamindars of the Arain tribe. At the time of partition, many of them relocated to various parts of the Punjab, Pakistan.

Transport 
Shahkot Malisian station is the nearest train station. The nearest international airport is located in Chandigarh.

References 

Villages in Jalandhar district